The IDX Composite (formerly: JSX Composite, Indonesian: Indeks Harga Saham Gabungan, IHSG) is an index of all stocks listed on the Indonesia Stock Exchange, IDX (formerly known as Jakarta Stock Exchange, JSX).

Annual Returns 
The following table shows the annual development of the IDX Composite since 1982.

Records

Milestones 
The following is a timeline on the rise of the IDX Composite through Indonesian stock market history.

Largest Percentage and Points Changes 
From CNBC Indonesia, there are five days when Indonesian Stock Exchange up more than 10% in a day. Also, there are another Top-5 most points gains and lose in a single day since the data gathered from 1998.

Components 

Indonesia Stock Exchange currently lists 820 companies.

As for Sharia Index (ISSI), consist of 502 companies

See also
 Indonesia Stock Exchange

References

External links
IDX Composite Index
^JKSE: Summary of INDEX - Yahoo! Finance
Bloomberg page for JCI:IND
Reuters page for .JKSE

Indonesia Stock Exchange
Indonesian stock market indices